Hande Subaşı (born 21 February 1984) is a Turkish actress and beauty pageant titleholder. She was the winner of the 2005 Miss Turkey competition. As an actress, she has appeared in more than nine films and theatre since 2006.

Filmography

Film

TV series

References

External links 

1984 births
Living people
Turkish film actresses
Turkish beauty pageant winners
Actresses from Ankara